Ahmed El-Sayed Refaat Ahmed (born 20 June 1993) is an Egyptian professional footballer who plays for Future as a winger.

Career

Club
Refaat started his career playing for ENPPI. In 2016, he joined Zamalek, to be loaned back to ENPPI in 2019, then to Al Ittihad. In November 2020, he transferred to Al Masry. In October 2021, he transferred to Future.

International

International goals
Scores and results list Egypt's goal tally first, score column indicates score after each Refaat goal.

Honours

Club
Zamalek
Egypt Cup: 2017–18
Egyptian Super Cup: 2016

International
Egypt U-20
African U-20 Championship: 2013

References

External links
 
 

1993 births
Living people
Egyptian footballers
ENPPI SC players
Zamalek SC players
Al Ittihad Alexandria Club players
Al Masry SC players
Future FC (Egypt) players
Al Wahda FC players
Egyptian Premier League players
UAE Pro League players
Association football wingers
Egyptian expatriate footballers
Expatriate footballers in the United Arab Emirates
Egyptian expatriate sportspeople in the United Arab Emirates